Nicholas Mantis (December 7, 1935 – August 13, 2017) was an American-Greek professional basketball player.

College career
After having a standout career as a high school player at East Chicago Washington High, while playing for head coach Johnny Baratto; Mantis enjoyed a stellar collegiate career at Northwestern, where he led the Wildcats in field goal percentage as a senior. That season (1958–59), he served as team captain, and led them to their best finish in the Big Ten - a tie for 2nd with an 8-6 conference record, 15-7 overall.  The Wildcats won nine of their first ten games, dropping a stunner to #5 ranked North Carolina in the University of Louisville-hosted 'Bluegrass Festival Tournament.'  The Wildcats spent seven consecutive weeks on the AP Poll, and knocked off the Jerry West-led West Virginia Mountaineers.

Professional career
Mantis was selected in the 1959 NBA Draft, by the St. Louis Hawks, after a collegiate career at Northwestern University. He played for the Hawks, Minneapolis Lakers, and Chicago Zephyrs, during a two-year NBA career. Mantis also played in the American Basketball League in the 1961–62 season, and in the Midwest Professional Basketball League, earning league MVP and first-team all-league honors, in the 1963–64 season.

Death
Mantis died on August 13, 2017, at the age of 81.

References

External links
Indiana Basketball Hall of Fame entry

1935 births
2017 deaths
American men's basketball players
American people of Greek descent
Basketball players from Indiana
Chicago Zephyrs players
Greek men's basketball players
Kansas City Steers players
Minneapolis Lakers players
Northwestern Wildcats men's basketball players
Shooting guards
St. Louis Hawks draft picks
St. Louis Hawks players